NOS Journaal is the umbrella name for the news broadcasts of the Dutch public broadcaster NOS on radio and television. The division of the NOS responsible for gathering and broadcasting the news is known as NOS Nieuws, and is based at the Media Park in Hilversum; the NOS also has fully equipped radio and television studios in The Hague, from which political programmes are often produced.

History 
On 5 January 1956, the Nederlandse Televise Stichting (Dutch Television Foundation, the forerunner of the NOS) broadcast the first NTS-journaal bulletin: initially, these were broadcast three times a week. Each edition lasted fifteen minutes, and had no presenter. From 3 October 1957, Coen van Hoewijk became the first newsreader of NTS-journaal, and by extension, on Dutch television; the first female newsreader, Eugènie Herlaar, started in 1965. The number of broadcasts increased over time. The Nederlandse Omroep Stichting (Dutch Broadcasting Foundation) was founded in 1969, as a result of a merger between the NTS and the Nederlandse Radio Union.

On 6 January 1973 at 8pm, the autocue was introduced; previously, the newsreaders read from scripts printed on paper.

In 1989, NOS Journaal gained competition, in the form of RTL Nieuws, broadcast on the then-upstart channel RTL Véronique. Since then, other channels have launched, bringing with them their own news broadcasts, such as SBS 6 with its successful Hart van Nederland (Heart of the Netherlands), which focuses on news from within the Netherlands.

Major changes to the presentation of NOS Journaal were made in May 2012: the anchors now presented the news standing up, as opposed to being sat behind a desk, and the news began to be delivered with the help of a large videowall displaying pictures of the day's news. According to the NOS, these changes were made in order to give a greater sense of urgency and to connect more with the viewer.

Broadcasts

Evening 
Evening bulletins are broadcast at 6pm, 8pm and midnight on NPO 1 every day; in addition, current affairs programme Nieuwsuur, broadcast nightly at 9.30 pm on NPO 2, also includes a news bulletin, presented by an NOS newsreader.

The 8pm broadcast is the oldest and considered to be the most important edition of NOS Journaal, typically lasting for 25 minutes; there is more in-depth coverage of the news compared to the 6pm edition, and there is a comprehensive weather report at the end, presented by a meteorologist.

Daytime 
As of 2018, there are NOS Journaal bulletins every half hour on weekdays between 6:30am and 9am on NPO 1, which are simulcast with a sign language interpreter on NPO 2, and hourly bulletins broadcast on NPO 1 or NPO 2 between 9am and 5pm. There are fewer bulletins at weekends: on Saturdays, the first bulletin is broadcast at 1pm, and on Sundays at 12pm; there is also a short bulletin at 5pm.

Studios 

NOS Journaal is broadcast from studios 8 and 10 at the Media Park, Hilversum. The 6pm and 8pm bulletins, along with Nieuwsuur and NOS Jeugdjournaal, are produced in Studio 8, while daytime bulletins come from Studio 10.

Design and theme music 
The design of NOS Journaal has changed many times throughout its history. The first title sequence of the NTS-journaal was controversial, because it showed footage of women wearing short skirts and men dressed in leotards; the NCRV objected and as such, the footage was removed from the intro.

The theme music to NOS Journaal has traditionally featured the sound of a gong; however, this was not the case between 1988 and 1995, nor was it so between 2005 and 2012. The theme music used from 1995 to 2001, which was composed by Stephen Emmer, used the same gong as was used in the original theme from 1956. After a long search, the gong was found in the Tropenmuseum in Amsterdam; as there was a small crack in the gong, the gong itself had to be repaired.

On 17 December 2005, the NOS Journaal received a rebrand, which was designed by British design agency Lambie-Nairn. The NOS itself also received a new logo, featuring a red 'O', a motif which featured prominently in the logos, title sequences and sets of all programmes produced by the NOS. The radio news bulletins, previously known as NOS Radio Nieuws, were also renamed to NOS Journaal; as well as the news section on NOS Teletexst. New theme music was also introduced, composed once again by Stephen Emmer.

On 27 May 2012, the corporate identity was revamped again: many elements, such as the use of the colour red, were retained. For the 6pm and 8pm bulletins, presenters no longer sat down to present the news, instead standing and walking around the studio, in front of a newly built video wall. New theme music and title sequences were also introduced, with the red 'O' motif becoming a focal point in the title sequences.

References

External links 
 

Dutch television news shows
1956 Dutch television series debuts
1950s Dutch television series
1960s Dutch television series
1970s Dutch television series
1980s Dutch television series
1990s Dutch television series
2000s Dutch television series
2010s Dutch television series
2020s Dutch television series
NPO 1 original programming
NPO 2 original programming
NPO 3 original programming